Beech Grove is an unincorporated community and census-designated place in McLean County, Kentucky, United States. Its population was 243 as of the 2010 census. Beech Grove has a post office with ZIP code 42322, which opened on April 29, 1878.

Geography

Transportation
Kentucky Routes 56, 136, and 256 pass through the community.

Demographics

Notable People from Beech Grove
Troy E. Coleman

References

Unincorporated communities in McLean County, Kentucky
Unincorporated communities in Kentucky
Census-designated places in McLean County, Kentucky
Census-designated places in Kentucky